Elections to North Down Borough Council were held on 30 May 1973 on the same day as the other Northern Irish local government elections. The election used four district electoral areas to elect a total of 20 councillors.

The elections were the first following the reorganisation of local government in Northern Ireland, brought about by the Local Government (Boundaries) Act (Northern Ireland) 1971 & Local Government Act (Northern Ireland) 1972, which replaced the previous FPTP ward system with a new system of proportional representation using multi-member district electoral areas.

Election results

Districts summary

|- class="unsortable" align="centre"
!rowspan=2 align="left"|Ward
! % 
!Cllrs
! %
!Cllrs
! %
!Cllrs
!rowspan=2|TotalCllrs
|- class="unsortable" align="center"
!colspan=2 bgcolor="" | UUP
!colspan=2 bgcolor="" | Alliance
!colspan=2 bgcolor="white"| Others
|-
|align="left"|Area A
|bgcolor="40BFF5"|57.5
|bgcolor="40BFF5"|3
|31.0
|2
|11.5
|0
|5
|-
|align="left"|Area B
|bgcolor="40BFF5"|44.5
|bgcolor="40BFF5"|2
|21.5
|1
|34.0
|2
|5
|-
|align="left"|Area C
|bgcolor="40BFF5"|38.2
|bgcolor="40BFF5"|2
|28.8
|2
|33.0
|1
|5
|-
|align="left"|Area D
|bgcolor="40BFF5"|42.6
|bgcolor="40BFF5"|2
|36.9
|2
|20.5
|1
|5
|- class="unsortable" class="sortbottom" style="background:#C9C9C9"
|align="left"| Total
|46.0
|9
|29.5
|7
|24.5
|4
|20
|-
|}

Districts results

Area A

1973: 3 x UUP, 2 x Alliance

Area B

1973: 2 x UUP, 2 x Loyalist, 1 x Alliance

Area C

1973: 2 x Alliance, 2 x UUP, 1 x Loyalist

Area D

1973: 2 x UUP, 2 x Alliance, 1 x Loyalist

References

North Down Borough Council elections
North Down